The League of Legends Japan League (LJL) is the top level of professional League of Legends competition in Japan. The league franchised prior to start of the 2019 season and has eight teams under partnership. Each annual season of play is divided into two splits, spring and summer, both consisting of ten rounds of round-robin tournament play, which then conclude with playoff tournaments between the top three teams. The spring and summer champions qualify for the Mid-Season Invitational and World Championship respectively.

Format 
Eight teams compete in a double round robin during the group stage, with matches being best-of-ones. The top six teams from the group stage advance to single-elimination format playoffs, with the top two beginning in the second round.

The playoff format is as follows:
 Round 1: The third seed from the group stage play against sixth seed, with the fourth seed facing fifth seed.
 Round 2: The first seed from the group stage chooses whether to play against from the Round 1 winner, with the second seed facing the remaining team.
 Finals: The winners of Round 2 face each other in the final best-of-five series.

The winners of the spring and summer splits will represent Japan at the Mid-Season Invitational and World Championship respectively.

Teams

Current

Former 
 7th heaven
 DetonatioN RabbitFive (DetonatioN FocusMe's sister team)
 Okinawan Tigers
 PENTAGRAM (formerly Rampage)
 SCARZ
 Unsold Stuff Gaming
 Rascal Jester

Past seasons

References

External links 
 

League of Legends competitions
Recurring sporting events established in 2014
Sports leagues in Japan